Dhumku is a small hilly village which lies in Uttarkashi District of Uttarakhand state of India. Jadh Ganga, an important tributary of the Bhagirathi River, flows through this place. Some of the nearby villages are Nelang (Congsa), Jadhang (Sang) and Pulam Sumda, which all lie in the valley of the Jadh Ganga (claimed by China and controlled by India).

Geography 

See Geography of Dhumku, Nelang, Pulam Sumda, Sumla and Mana Pass area and Geography of Mana.

History

Territorial dispute 

The valley of the Jadh Ganga is claimed by China and controlled by India.

Culture

This area is inhabited by the Char Bhutia tribe who practice Tibetan Buddhism.

See also 

 India-China Border Roads 
 Line of Actual Control
 List of disputed territories of India

References

Cities and towns in Uttarkashi district